John Arthur "Long John" Sorrell (January 16, 1906 — November 30, 1984) was a Canadian ice hockey left winger in the NHL playing for the Detroit Falcons (later renamed the Detroit Red Wings) and the New York Americans between 1930 and 1941. He later played for and coached the Indianapolis Capitals of the AHL, and retired in 1945. With the Red Wings he won the Stanley Cup twice, in 1936 and 1937.

Personal life
Sorrell was born in Chesterville, Ontario on 16 January 1906 to John Sorrell (1880-1931) and Mary Lafleur (1881-1925). On 3 May 1928, John married his first wife, Florence Margaret Einberger, daughter of Martin Einberger and Mary Rappel, in Dundas County, Ontario, Canada. Florence died in 1943. On 8 September 1945, John married his second wife Gladys Maxine Galloway, daughter of Robert J. Galloway and Mellie V. Peacock, in Steuben County, Indiana.

Sorrell died on 30 November 1984 at his home in Indianapolis, Indiana. His cause of death was a heart attack due to lung cancer.

Playing career
Sorrell played junior hockey for three different teams in three different leagues. In 1926 he was a young left winger for the Chesterville Colts of the Ontario Hockey Association and showed great promise. He was quickly noticed and in 1927 played forty games for the  Quebec Beavers of the CAHL before being called up into the Canadian Professional Hockey League the following year for the Windsor Bulldogs. He was finally noticed by the NHL when the Montreal Canadiens signed him. He never played a game for Montreal, but was instead traded to the London Tecumsehs of the IHL on November 5, 1929. Sorrell continued to show promise and helped the Tecumsehs to a third-place finish in the IHL.

On November 10, 1930 he was traded to the Detroit Falcons, and finally found a place to call home for more than a single season. He would spend the next nine years with the Detroit club helping the team to win consecutive Stanley Cups in 1936 and 1937.

On February 13, 1938, Sorrell was traded for Hap Emms to the New York Americans where he would spend the rest of his NHL career. He retired from the league in the 1940–41 season,  spending his remaining playing days in the AHL with both the Hershey Bears and Indianapolis Capitals, turning to coaching in the 1945–46 season.

Career statistics

Regular season and playoffs

Awards and achievements
Won the Stanley Cups two times with the Detroit Red Wings (1936 & 1937)

References

External links

1906 births
1984 deaths
Canadian ice hockey coaches
Canadian ice hockey left wingers
Detroit Falcons players
Detroit Olympics (IHL) players
Detroit Red Wings players
Hershey Bears players
Ice hockey people from Ontario
Indianapolis Capitals players
London Panthers players
New York Americans players
People from the United Counties of Stormont, Dundas and Glengarry
Pittsburgh Hornets players
Quebec Castors players
Stanley Cup champions
Windsor Bulldogs (CPHL) players
Canadian expatriate ice hockey players in the United States